Euconnus intrusus, is a species of ant-like stone beetle found in Albania, Samos, Iran and Sri Lanka.

References 

Staphylinoidea
Insects of Sri Lanka
Insects of India
Insects described in 1844